Jan Vladimír Kraus (born 15 August 1953) is a Czech actor and TV host. He appeared in more than eighty films since 1967. Kraus was also a judge on Česko Slovensko má talent (Czecho Slovakia's Got Talent). He is the host of the television talk show Show Jana Krause. His father Ota Kraus, a Holocaust survivor, was a journalist and writer. The writer Ivan Kraus is his brother.

He has appeared in several Theatre Studio DVA productions.

Selected filmography

References

External links
 
 

1953 births
Living people
Male actors from Prague
Czech male film actors
Czech male television actors
20th-century Czech male actors
21st-century Czech male actors